Lidiya Averyanova (born 4 March 1960) is a Russian rower. She competed in the women's eight event at the 1988 Summer Olympics.

References

1960 births
Living people
Russian female rowers
Olympic rowers of the Soviet Union
Rowers at the 1988 Summer Olympics
Place of birth missing (living people)